The Avon Ring is a canal ring which is located to the south west of Birmingham in England, and connects the major towns of Stratford-upon-Avon, Evesham, Tewkesbury, Worcester and the southern outskirts of Birmingham.

The route

The concept of a canal ring is a recent one, having been coined in 1965 to describe routes which could be used by people boating for leisure, that did not require holiday makers to return to their start location by the same route as they had used to reach their destination. The constituent waterways of the Avon Ring, which can take about two weeks to navigate are:
River Avon
River Severn
Worcester and Birmingham Canal
Stratford-on-Avon Canal

Starting from Stratford-upon-Avon, and travelling in a clockwise direction, the Avon Ring follows the downstream course of the River Avon through Evesham to arrive at Tewkesbury, where the river joins the River Severn. There are 17 locks on this  section, ten before Evesham and seven afterwards. The River Avon is a navigation, and so each lock is accompanied by a weir, to maintain the flow of the river.

This is the longest level section, as the only lock is located at Diglis, just before the junction with the Worcester and Birmingham Canal.

From the junction with the River Severn, there are two locks to reach Diglis Basin, and then another eight as the canal leaves Worcester. The Offerton flight of six locks follows, just before the canal passes under the M5 motorway, after which the  Dunhampstead tunnel is encountered. The top lock of the flight brings to 58 the number of locks worked in just , as the final section is level. The canal meanders across rural Worcestershire, passing under the M42 motorway just to the north of Alvechurch, before entering the Wast Hills Tunnel. Within a mile, Kings Norton Junction is reached, where the Stratford-upon-Avon Canal begins, and the  journey up the Worcester and Birmingham Canal ends.

The start of the Stratford-upon-Avon canal is marked by a guillotine lock, which used to prevent water passing between the canals, but is now maintained in an open position. The first  is level, with a five-mile (8 km) urban section containing the  Brandwood tunnel, and a six-mile (9.6 km) rural section which passes under the M42 motorway. The 26 locks of the Lapwood flight start the descent towards Stratford-upon-Avon, with the final one in the shadow of the M40 motorway bridge. The Lapworth Link turns off near locks 20 and 21, to connect with the Grand Union Canal. Only one of these two locks needs to be negotiated, as they are on parallel routes. Another 27 locks complete the journey to Stratford-upon-Avon, with eleven of them concentrated in the Wilmcote flight.

Points of interest

See also

Canals of the United Kingdom
History of the British canal system

Bibliography

References

Canals in England
Canal rings in the United Kingdom